William Benjamin Cornwell (November 25, 1864 – April 8, 1926) was an American lawyer, businessperson, newspaper editor and publisher, and railroad and timber executive in the U.S. state of West Virginia. He was an older brother of writer and newspaper publisher Marshall S. Cornwell (1871–1898) and of West Virginia Governor John J. Cornwell (1867–1953).

Cornwell studied jurisprudence at the West Virginia University College of Law, and afterward began practicing law in Romney. In 1890, he and his brother, John J. Cornwell, purchased  The Review and South Branch Intelligencer newspapers. Following their acquisition of the South Branch Intelligencer, they renamed the newspaper Hampshire Review. In 1900, Cornwell sold his ownership in the Hampshire Review to his brother John. While he owned the newspaper, Cornwell served as the Prosecuting Attorney for Hampshire County (1892–1900). In addition to serving as Prosecuting Attorney, he served as the Commissioner of School Lands for Hampshire County in 1900. In 1902, he relocated to Fairmont, where he engaged in the practice of law until 1910.

He and his brother, John were corporators and shareholders of the South Branch Boom and Lumber Company following its incorporation in 1901. They were also corporators and shareholders of the Potomac White Sand Company of Green Spring following its incorporation in 1902. Cornwell served as the president of the Hampshire Southern Railroad which was constructed under his leadership, beginning in June 1909, and he continued to operate it until 1911 when it was purchased by the Moorefield and Virginia Railroad Company.

Cornwell organized, and became the president of, the Winchester and Western Railroad which had been incorporated in 1916. In addition to serving as the company's president, he also served on its board of directors. In 1921, he also organized a subsidiary, Winchester Lumber Corporation, for the purpose of developing the timber resources of Hampshire and Hardy counties in West Virginia and Frederick County in Virginia. Cornwell served as the president and general manager of the Winchester Lumber Corporation. He died in 1926 in Romney, West Virginia and was interred next to his first wife Nannie and second wife Sophie at Indian Mound Cemetery.

Early life and family 
William Benjamin Cornwell was born in Hampshire County, West Virginia on November 25, 1864, the eldest child and son of Jacob H. Cornwell and his wife Mary Eleanor Taylor. Shortly after his birth, his parents moved the family west to Ritchie County, West Virginia, where his mother's twin brother John Taylor and uncle Eli Taylor were residing. Cornwell and his family returned to the Cornwell family farm on South Branch Mountain (also known as Jersey Mountain) in Hampshire County in 1869.

Legal education and career 
Cornwell studied jurisprudence at the West Virginia University College of Law and graduated from the institution. He commenced practicing law in Romney, and shortly thereafter, was elected Prosecuting Attorney for Hampshire County in 1892, and continued to serve in that position until 1900. In addition to serving as Prosecuting Attorney, Cornwell served as the Commissioner of School Lands for Hampshire County in 1900. His brother John Jacob studied law in Cornwell's law office in Romney, and was admitted to the state bar association in 1894.

On June 30, 1891, Cornwell married Nannie V. Dellinger (1869–1893) of Middletown, Virginia. They had two children before her death on June 29, 1893. Cornwell's second marriage was to Sophie H. Colston (1878–1928) in Martinsburg, West Virginia on June 14, 1899. She was the daughter of W. B. Colston and his wife Minnie Colston of Martinsburg. Cornwell relocated to Fairmont in 1902, and engaged in the practice of law there. In 1906, lawyer Raymond J. Abbaticchio arrived in Fairmont and entered Cornwell's law office and later became a junior member of the law firm of Cornwell & Abbaticchio. They maintained their partnership until Cornwell's departure from Fairmont in 1910.

Newspaper publishing career 
In 1890, shortly after Cornwell began practicing law in Romney, he and his brother John Jacob Cornwell purchased the newspaper The Review from C. F. Poland, who assured the newspaper's subscribers in a November 6, 1890, farewell editorial that the new owners would continue to publish the Review while following "Jeffersonian principles." At the time they purchased the newspaper, The Review used the Wirgman Building's second floor for its offices and printing plant. Later that same year, they purchased The Review'''s rival newspaper in Romney, the South Branch Intelligencer. Following this acquisition, Cornwell and his brother added Hampshire to the newspaper's name and included and the South Branch Intelligencer in smaller print within the masthead underneath The Hampshire Review. The Hampshire Review continued to operate from the second floor of the Wirgman Building until 1895 when Cornwell and his brother relocated the newspaper's office and printing plant to the first floor of their new brick building on West Main Street. In 1900, Cornwell sold his ownership in the Hampshire Review'' to his brother, and in 1902, he moved to Fairmont.

Business and railroad career

Cornwell and brother John Jacob were corporators and shareholders of the South Branch Boom and Lumber Company following the issue of its incorporation charter on May 1, 1901. Its principal office was located in Romney, West Virginia. The company constructed a log boom on the South Branch Potomac River to collect and contain floating logs timbered from nearby forests. They were also corporators and shareholders of the Potomac White Sand Company of Green Spring, West Virginia, following the issue of its incorporation charter on May 10, 1902. This company engaged in the mining, preparation, manufacturing, and distribution of sand and other extracted minerals.

Hampshire Southern Railroad Company 
On August 20, 1906, the Hampshire Southern Railroad Company (HSRC) was incorporated to facilitate the construction and operation of a rail line along the south branch of the Potomac River connecting Grant and Hardy counties to the Baltimore and Ohio Railroad at Green Spring via West Romney Station at Romney. In addition to Cornwell, the company's corporators included his brother John Jacob, Duncan Sinclar, and his law firm partner Raymond J. Abbaticchio. Cornwell served as president of the HSRC whose track was laid under his leadership beginning in June 1909. The HSRC line was constructed  from the southern terminus of the Baltimore and Ohio Railroad's South Branch line at West Romney Station to McNeill; operations began along this completed section on April 20, 1910. Later in 1910, both freight and passenger service commenced between Romney and Moorefield. By October 1910, the remainder of the rail line was completed and operations began from Moorefield to Petersburg.

In May 1910, Cornwell and his wife purchased a property known as Mill Meadows, located at the confluence of Mill Creek and the South Branch Potomac River near Vanderlip. Cornwell made significant improvements to the property, including the construction of a bridge over Mill Creek connecting the residence to U.S. Route 50, and the building of additions to the residence using materials from the property's mill, which had been razed around 1908. Cornwell also built a barn and several other ancillary structures on the property. He and his wife sold Mill Meadows in August 1920 to James H. Blue.

The HSRC continued to operate this rail line until December 11, 1911, when it was purchased by the Moorefield and Virginia Railroad Company. The Moorefield and Virginia Railroad Company assumed the $700,000 mortgage against the rail line. Cornwell and Eugene Ailes, the son-in-law of his brother John Jacob, served as officers of the conveyancing company for the transaction. The Moorefield and Virginia Railroad Company subsequently transferred the rail line to the Baltimore and Ohio Railroad Company in November 1913.

Winchester and Western Railroad Company 
Cornwell organized and became the president of the Winchester and Western Railroad Company (WWRC) which had been incorporated in Virginia on August 16, 1916. It received its charter on August 31, 1916, to build and operate a rail line connecting Wardensville and the Lost River valley of West Virginia to the Baltimore and Ohio Railroad and the Cumberland Valley Railroad at Winchester, Virginia. In addition to serving as the railroad company's president, Cornwell also served on the board of directors of the WWRC. Fellow Romney lawyer and businessman Joshua Soule Zimmerman served as the company's secretary. Residents of Winchester and Frederick County, Virginia purchased $75,000 worth of stock in the WWRC prior to its construction. By May 17, 1921, the Inter-Mountain Construction Company had completed  of the WWRC line between Winchester and Wardensville. The line was serviced by gasoline engine locomotives for hauling freight and passengers.

Winchester Lumber Corporation 

Cornwell organized the subsidiary Winchester Lumber Corporation (WLC) in 1921 for the purpose of developing the timber resources of Hampshire and Hardy counties in West Virginia and Frederick County in Virginia. Under his leadership, the WLC acquired  of tracts of mountainous woodlands in Hardy, Hampshire, and Frederick counties in proximity to the Winchester and Western Railroad line. Cornwell served as the president and general manager of the WLC, and planned the construction of twenty sawmills, several general woodworking and finishing plants, power stations, and a cooperage plant. He operated the WLC from the Winchester and Western Railroad Building in Winchester. Due to illness, Cornwell resigned as president and general manager of the company in the Summer of 1925. In October 1925, after four years of operation, the Winchester Lumber Corporation filed for bankruptcy with debts estimated at $711,000 and assets worth slightly more than half of its debts. The Winchester and Western Railroad Company was unaffected by the bankruptcy of its subsidiary.

Later life and death 
As a member of the Winchester business community, Cornwell was a founding member and director of the Winchester Rotary International Club in 1921, and served as chairman of the club's initial nominating committee.

In December 1923, while visiting the Winchester residence of W. A. Baker, a fellow director of the Winchester and Western Railroad, Cornwell was rendered unconscious after a large longcase clock in a hallway toppled over, striking him on the head, and knocking him down. The longcase clock inflicted a severe wound to the back of Cornwell's head. He received first aid treatment from a physician present at the residence and was taken to his Winchester home where he regained consciousness.

Cornwell died as a result of ventricular hypertrophy at 5:00 p.m. on April 8, 1926, in Romney, West Virginia. Dr. Robert W. Dailey had attended Cornwell from March 13, 1925, until his death. Cornwell was interred on April 10, 1926, next to his first wife Nannie and second wife Sophie at Indian Mound Cemetery in Romney.

References

Bibliography

External links 
 

1864 births
1926 deaths
19th-century American newspaper publishers (people)
19th-century American lawyers
20th-century American businesspeople
20th-century American lawyers
American people of Welsh descent
20th-century American railroad executives
Burials at Indian Mound Cemetery
Businesspeople from Virginia
Businesspeople from West Virginia
Businesspeople in wood products
Cornwell family
County prosecuting attorneys in West Virginia
Editors of West Virginia newspapers
Lawyers from Fairmont, West Virginia
People from Ritchie County, West Virginia
People from Romney, West Virginia
People from Winchester, Virginia
West Virginia Democrats
West Virginia lawyers
West Virginia University College of Law alumni